A Punjabi-language Quran, written with the Gurmukhi script, has been found in the village of Lande, in the Moga district of Punjab State. It is believed to be the oldest Quran in this script, at around 115 years old.

It is reported to be the manifestation of religious harmony among various faiths in Punjab as it was translated from Arabic by a Sikh scholar, Sant Vaidya Gurdit Singh Alomhari of the Nirmala tradition, with money and other arrangements for its publication made by two Hindu businessmen, Bhagat Buddhamal Aadatli and Vaidya Bhaga, and a Sikh, Sardar Mela Singh Arif. It was first published by a Sikh publisher of Amritsar in 1911, with a print run of 1,000, and each copy sold for Rs2.25. The copy found in Moga is in the possession of Noor Mohammad.

References

1911 non-fiction books
Quran translations
Quran translations by language